"Overload" is a dance/trance song produced by DJs VooDoo & Serano. It reached number 30 on the UK Singles Chart on its release. Its chorus is similar to the Hungarian song "Tied a Szivem" by Dance4ever.

Charts

References

2003 singles
2003 songs
Electronic songs
House music songs